Helen Fisher may refer to:

 Helen Fisher (anthropologist) (born 1945), Canadian-American anthropologist and human behavior researcher
 Helen Fisher (composer) (born 1942), New Zealand composer
 Helen Fisher, keyboardist and backing vocalist with New Adventures
Helen Fisher Frye, educator and churchwoman

See also
Ellen Fisher (disambiguation)